The Oslofjord is an inlet in the south-east of Norway, stretching from an imaginary line between the  and  lighthouses and down to  in the south to Oslo in the north. It is part of the Skagerrak strait, connecting the North Sea and the Kattegat sea area, which leads to the Baltic Sea. The Oslofjord is not a fjord in the geological sense — in Norwegian the term  can refer to a wide range of waterways.

The innermost part is known as the Bunnefjorden.

Name

Geography
Each of the islands in the innermost part of the fjord has its own identity and distinguishing history. Among them are Hovedøya, Lindøya, Nakholmen, Bleikøya, Gressholmen, and Langøyene. These islands can be reached with the Oslo-boats from Aker Brygge. Hovedøya contains monastery ruins, Gressholmen for its rabbits, Nakholmen, Bleikøya, Lindøya for their cosy cabins at the water's edge, and finally Langøyene for its camping possibilities and beach. 

The inner part of the Oslofjord has steep and forest covered hill slopes down towards the fjord.

Climate

The Oslofjord has Norway's highest all year temperature: 7.5 degrees Celsius. February is the coldest month in the fjord with -1.3 degrees Celsius, while July normally has 17.2 degrees Celsius. The islands in the middle of the fjord are among Norway's warmest with high summer temperatures and moderate winters. Oslofjord's relatively high temperatures enable various flora to flourish.

History
The oldest settlements in the area surrounding the Oslofjord date from the Stone Age and the Bronze Age. It was here on the eastern and western shores that three of the best preserved Viking ships were unearthed. In historical times, this bay was known by the current name of the region, Viken (the bay).

Oslofjord has been an important body of water strategically due to its proximity to Oslo. During WWII, there were German installations at several points on its coastline. One installation in Hovedøya held 1,100 Wehrmacht soldiers and later women deemed Nazi collaborators at the National Internment Camp for Women in Hovedøya.

Norwegian painter Edvard Munch had a cottage and studio in Åsgårdstrand on the fjord and the Oslofjord appears in several of his paintings, including The Scream and Girls on the Pier.

Second World War

The fjord was the scene of a key event in the German invasion of Norway in April 1940, the Battle of Drøbak Sound. The invasion plan envisaged landing of 1,000 troops transported by ship to Oslo. Colonel Eriksen, Commander of the Oscarsborg fortress near Drøbak, mainly maintained for historical purposes, sank the German heavy cruiser Blücher in the Drøbak narrows.

The fortress's resistance blocked the route to Oslo, thus delaying the rest of the invading group long enough for the Norwegian royal family, government, parliament, and national treasury to evacuate. Thus Norway never surrendered to the Germans, leaving the Quisling government illegitimate and permitting Norway to participate as an ally in the war, rather than as a conquered nation.

Demographics
The entire population situated around the Oslofjord including Oslo is about 1.96 million, and the total population of all the counties situated around the fjord is approximately 2.2 million.

More than 40% of Norway's population resides under 45 minutes of driving from the Oslofjord. The Oslofjord has Norway's busiest traffic of ferries and cargo boats.

Although the Oslofjord contains hundreds of populated islands, most of the population of the fjord resides on the mainland.

Recreation
In the summer there are boats of all sizes on the fjord, and it is possible to go kayaking, canoeing, fishing, and sailing.

The Oslofjord is one of the nine venues of the Class 1 World Powerboat Championship.

Image gallery

References

External links

Havforskningsinstituttet om Oslofjorden: – Vi bør gripe denne muligheten [The Institute of Marine Research: – We should grasp this opportunity] (9 March 2021) NRK

 
Fjords of Viken
Fjords of Vestfold og Telemark
Landforms of Oslo